Averill is an unincorporated town in Essex County, Vermont, United States. The town was named for Samuel Averill, a landholder. The town was never formally incorporated, having never gained a large enough permanent population. The population was 21 at the 2020 census. The town's affairs are handled by the Unified Towns & Gores of Essex County. It is part of the Berlin, NH–VT Micropolitan Statistical Area.

History
Averill was originally chartered in 1762 as part of the Province of New Hampshire on the behalf of Royal Governor Benning Wentworth. Averill consisted of twenty three thousand and forty acres of land, which was divided among seventy equal shares, with the stipulation that the grantees must cultivate a tenth of their land within five years, and that all pine trees fit for ship masts must be preserved for that purpose. The first settlers arrived in the 1830s, and in 1840 the town had 11 residents. In the 1870s a sawmill was built in the neighboring town of Norton, which led to a rise in population to 48 residents in 1880. The Averill Lumber Co. formed in the 1880s, and operated a mill on the east side of Great Averill Lake until it burned down in 1898.

Geography
Averill is in northern Essex County, bordered by Canaan to the northeast, Lemington to the southeast, Bloomfield at the southernmost point, Lewis on the southwest, Averys Gore to the west, and Norton to the northwest.

Vermont Route 114 crosses the northern tip of the town, leading east  to Canaan village and west  to Norton. The town includes Great Averill Pond, Little Averill Pond, and Forest Lake. The highest point in the town is an unnamed  summit along the border with Lemington in the southeast.

Government
Averill, along with the unorganized towns of Lewis and Ferdinand, as well as the unincorporated areas of Avery's Gore, Warren's Gore, and Warner's Grant, has no local governance. In 2000, a representative Board of Governors (three members) was elected to replace the former Essex County Supervisor system.

Demographics

As of the census of 2000, there were 8 people, 3 households, and 2 families residing in the town. The population density was 0.2 inhabitants per square mile (0.1/km2). There were 192 housing units at an average density of 5.3 per square mile (2.1/km2). The racial makeup of the town was 100.00% White.

There were 3 households, out of which one had children under the age of 18 living with them, two were married couples living together, and one was a non-family. One household was made up of individuals who were 65 years of age or older. The average household size was 2.67 and the average family size was 3.50.

In the town, the population was spread out, with two people under the age of 18, one from 18 to 24, two from 25 to 44, one from 45 to 64, and two people who were 65 years of age or older. The median age was 42 years. There were three males and five females, out of which two were under the age of 18.

The median income for a household in the town was $27,500, and the median income for a family was $28,750. Males had a median income of $21,250 versus $13,750 for females. The per capita income for the town was $9,876. None of the population or families were below the poverty line.

Averill contains two lakes—Big Averill Lake (sometimes notated on maps as Great Averill pond) and Little Averill Lake. Big Averill is a relatively large, rectangular lake about 2 miles long and 0.7 miles wide.  One side of the lake (Cottage Road) is outfitted with electrical power, and the backside (Jackson Road) is not wired for electricity. Little Averill lies 1,000 yards to the southwest of Big Averill.

References

External links
 Averill at Virtual Vermont
 "A Study of Lakes in Northeastern Vermont", John Ross Mills, Vermont Geological Survey (1951)

Berlin, New Hampshire micropolitan area
Towns in Essex County, Vermont
Towns in Vermont